Denis E. Waitley (born 1933), is an American motivational speaker, writer and consultant. He has been recognized as the best-selling author of the audio series, The Psychology of Winning and books such as "Seeds of Greatness" and "The Winner's Edge". Waitley has been inducted into the International Speakers' Hall of Fame.

Early life and education
Waitley was born in San Diego, California. His mother was a factory worker and his father worked in a warehouse, after serving during World War II. Waitley's parents divorced when he was ten and he had little contact with his father thereafter. He attended the United States Naval Academy at Annapolis and became a naval aviator after graduation. Waitley received his Bachelor's of Science degree from the Naval Academy.

Career
After leaving the Navy, Waitley became a financial public relations representative for an electronics company. Later, he was offered a job by Jonas Salk to be a fundraiser at the Salk Institute for Biological Studies. In 1976, Waitley recorded some of the audiotape that would become The Psychology of Winning at a local church. He released the audio program in 1978, which has sold more than 2 million copies and generated $100 million in sales. During the 1980s through 2000's, Waitley released more than 15 books such as Seeds of Greatness, The Winner's Edge and Empires of the Mind. In 2007, Waitley announced his retirement from the board of directors of Usana after Usana failed to verify some of Waitley's claimed qualifications.

Waitley was also a founding member of the National Council for Self-Esteem and a former chairman of psychology for the U.S. Olympic Committee's Sports Medicine Council.

Selected bibliography
Waitley has authored 16 books and has released more than 10 best-selling audio programs.

The Psychology of Winning (1979) 
Seeds of Greatness (1983) ,
New Dynamics of Winning: Gain the Mind-Set of a Champion for Unlimited Success in Business and Life (1995) 
The Dragon And The Eagle
Safari to the Soul (2004) 
The Seeds of Greatness Treasury
The Psychology of Winning for Women (1999) 
Being the Best (1987) 
The Winners Edge: The Critical Attitude of Success (1985) 
The Joy of Working (1986) 
The New Dynamics of Goal Setting: Flextactics for a Fast-changing World (1996) 
Psychology of Success: Developing Your Self-esteem (1996) 
Quantum Fitness: Breakthrough to Excellence (1986) 
Empires of the Mind: Lessons to Lead and Succeed in a Knowledge-based World (1995)

References

External links 
 
 Waitley other website

1933 births
Living people
American motivational writers
American motivational speakers
Audiobook narrators
Business speakers
American self-help writers
Popular psychology
People associated with direct selling